Shri Samarth Muppin Kaadsiddheswar Maharaj (23 April 1905 – 16 August 2001) was a guru in the Navnath tradition of Hindu philosophy. He was a disciple of Shri Samarth Siddharameshwar Maharaj, disciple of Shri Samarth Bhausaheb Maharaj, disciple of Shri Gurulingajangam Maharaj (Shri Nimbargi Maharaj), disciple of the 22nd Shri Samarth Muppin Kaadsiddheswar Maharaj.

Biography 
Kaadsiddheswar was born on April 23, 1905 (Chaitra Sankashti day) in Linganoor village, Kolhapur district, Maharashtra state, India. His father's name was Shaigauda Patil, and he was named Jaigauda Patil.
His living descendant is Indumati Magdum (daughter of his real sister). Indumati is 85 and lives with her son Sanjeev, daughter in law Jayashree and grand daughter Krupa in Nagala Park, Kolhapur.

He was formally adopted by the 25th Virupaksha Kaadeshwar of the Kaneri Math, Lingayat Parampara, and invested as the 26th Mathadheepati of the (Siddhagiri) Kaneri Math, Lingayat Parampara, in 1922 at the age of 17.

He was a master in yoga and mastered all the difficult asanas, such as the Kumbhak, which he could maintain for nine minutes. He would meditate for over ten hours a day, and from 1922 to 1935 he mastered all aspects of the Hindu spiritual tradition and philosophy.

He met his philosophical and spiritual guru, Siddharameshwar, in 1935. He was given a new outlook on the deep philosophical concepts and attained self-realization, or Gyan Drishti. He taught that concepts of sects and religions are an illusion and that everything is unified. To realize this unity is the simplest form of Vidnyani Avastha.

The Kaadsiddheshwar Parampara 
Shri Samarth Revannath (c. 1112 CE), one of the Navnath Parampara (The Nine Teachers) in the Indian Teacher-Disciple tradition, is considered the founder and the first Kaadsiddheshwar. He established the Kaadsiddheshwar temple and math at Kanheri village in Karveer tehsil, Kolhapur district, Maharashtra state, India. The Kaadsiddheshwar Peeth is also the main Kuldaivat (Dynastic Gods/Teachers) of the Lingayat Shaiva community. Shri Muppin Kaadsiddheswar Maharaj the 26th Mathaadheepati of this tradition from 1922 to 2001.

Siddhagiri Math (Kaneri Math) 

The Siddhagiri Math was established around the Moola-Kaadsiddheswar Shiva temple in the Shaiva-Lingayat tradition. It is a vast campus with the central Shiva temple, Adhyatmik Center, and a complex of halls for discussions, residential hostels for devotees, and adjacent farms. About 1200 villages in the area are devoted to the Kaadsiddheswar Parampara.

Inchegiri Sampradaya

Kaadsiddheshwar's guru Siddharameshwar belonged to the Inchegiri Sampradaya, a Navnath/Lingayat sampradaya which is strongly influenced by the Sant Mat and the Deshastha Brahmin caste, to which the thirteenth century Varkari saint and philosopher Dnyaneshwar belonged, the 16th century sant Eknath, and the 17th century saint and spiritual poet Samarth Ramdas.

His Contribution to the Hindu Spiritual Philosophy 
Kaadsiddheswar worked extensively with poor laborers and farmers. He gave extensive discourses on Hindu philosophy and the right way to live, which would lead him to Gyan Drishti and Vignayni Avastha. His main focus was to live his life fully while understanding that the world is an illusion, or Maya. Realizing this is considered Gyan Drishti, literally knowledge and vision, and living according to this concept is to be in Vignayni Avastha.

He renovated the Kaneri Math and renamed it Siddhagiri Math. He constructed a 42 ft tall idol of a meditating Shiva with an equally massive Nandi, built halls and hostels for devotees, started a school with a hostel for poor, underprivileged students on the Math campus, and started an old-age home there.

He revitalized the pravachans (discourses) organized in the Siddhagiri Math. These were organized on every full moon and on every major Hindu religious occasion, like the Sharavan Month, the Navratri and Ramnavmi. However, the largest pravachans were organized on the three-day festival around Maha Shivarati day (February–March), where over 50,000 lakh devotees have been recorded at the Siddhagiri Math.

He also established maths in Mumbai, Mahabaleshwar, Khopi-Pedambe, Amurteshwar-Satara, Pune and elsewhere. Discourses were organized in these centers of philosophy regularly. They were delivered in the Marathi language and were very simple to understand. They mainly focused on the concept of "Aham Brahmasmi" ("I am Brahma"). Brahma is a complex word with several layers of meaning, including universe, soul, eternity, timelessness and nothingness. His constant teaching was "Ghabru Nakos" ("Do not fear" in Marathi) and "Soham" ("That Itself is Me"). He propagated the Shrimad Dasbodh, a book by Samarth Ramdas, as the basic and simplest book on philosophy. During His discourses, he would often quote the Mahāvākyas.

Books 

He wrote mainly in Marathi.
Aachar va Parmartha (Behavior and The Right Way)
Parmartha va Japanustha (The Right way and the Chanting of Mantras)
Parmartha va Satkarma (The Right Way and Correct Actions)
Parmartha va Swadharma (The Right Way and Self Philosophy)
Dharma Parampara, Rudhi va Parmartha (The tradition of Right, Traditions and The Right Way)
Maza Europe cha Daura – (My Travels to Europe)

He also wrote several essays on philosophy, mainly for the quarterly magazine Siddhagiri Sandesh (Message from Siddhagiri), published from 1964.

References

Sources

External links 
 Kolhapur
 Siddhara Meshwar 
 Kanerimath 

20th-century Hindu religious leaders
1905 births
People from Kolhapur district
2001 deaths
Inchegeri Sampradaya
Marathi Hindu saints